Ethan Craig Brierley (born 23 November 2003) is an English footballer who plays as a midfielder for Rochdale.

Early life
Brierley was born in Rochdale.

Career
Having supported Rochdale from the age of three and progressed through the club's academy, Brierley was named on Rochdale's bench for a FA Cup match against Newcastle United in January 2020, at the age of 15. Because of his age, Brierley had to get changed separately to the rest of Rochdale's first team. He made his professional debut for Rochdale on 5 September 2020 in a 1–0 EFL Cup victory away to Huddersfield Town. He signed his first professional contract with the club on 26 November 2020, having turned 17 earlier that week. 

On 24 March 2022, Brierley joined National League North side Spennymoor Town on loan for the remainder of the 2021–22 season. On 29 April 2022, Brierley was recalled from this loan spell by parent club Rochdale.

Career statistics

References

2003 births
Living people
Footballers from Rochdale
English footballers
Association football midfielders
Rochdale A.F.C. players
Spennymoor Town F.C. players
English Football League players
National League (English football) players